Milton Hopkins may refer to:
 Milton Hopkins (biologist) (1906–1983), professor of biology
 Milton N. Hopkins (1926–2007), American farmer, conservationist, naturalist, and author from Georgia
 Milton W. Hopkins (1789–1844), American portrait painter in the folk art tradition